Total DramaRama is an animated comedy children's television series created by Tom McGillis and Jennifer Pertsch that premiered on Cartoon Network in the United States on September 1, 2018, and on Teletoon in Canada on October 7, 2018.

Series overview

Episodes

Season 1 (2018–19)

Season 2 (2020–21)

Season 3 (2021–22)

Notes

References 

Total DramaRama